Rojek may refer to:
 Rojek, Sulęcin County, a settlement in the administrative district of Gmina Torzym, within Sulęcin County, Lubusz Voivodeship, in western Poland
 Rojek (surname)
 Rojek (film), a Canadian documentary film